Martin Steinegger (born February 15, 1972) is a Swiss professional ice hockey defenceman. He played in the Nationalliga A for EHC Biel and SC Bern. He won the Swiss-A championship in 1997 and 2004 with SC Bern.

International Play
On April 24, 2006 Steinegger played his 200th game for the Swiss national team.

Career statistics

Regular season and playoffs

International

External links

1972 births
Living people
EHC Biel players
Ice hockey players at the 2002 Winter Olympics
Olympic ice hockey players of Switzerland
People from Biel/Bienne
SC Bern players
Swiss ice hockey defencemen
Sportspeople from the canton of Bern